Davide Favaro (born 7 May 1984) is a former Italian professional footballer who played as a midfielder.

Youth Soccer Career

Born in Mirano, Veneto,  Favaro started his youth career at A.C. Milan of Lombardy, where he played for five years from the  1998/99 to the 2002/2003 season.

In his five years at A.C. Milan, Favaro scored 59 goals. Unfortunately, in March 2003 he had a ligament rupture that didn't allow him to play until January 2004.

In 2003, A.C. Milan swapped youth players with Internazionale and Parma. That season, Favaro (€1M), Marco Donadel (€2M), and Mirko Stefani (€1M) of Milan were swapped for Roberto Massaro (€2M), Filippo Porcari (€1M) and Luca Ferretti (€1M). All deals were co-ownership deals and Favaro signed a 5-year contract. Favaro played a season at Primavera Team, where he was again trained by his former coach Davide Ballardini as well as scoring 6 goals in 12 matches.

In June 2004, Parma bought the remaining rights to Favaro and Stefani, while Donadel was bought back by Milan and received in return the remaining rights for Porcari and Ferretti.

Favaro played for the Italy National Team at 2001 UEFA European Under-16 Football Championship qualifiers.

Professional Soccer Career

Since the 2004 season,  Favaro was loaned to clubs in Serie C1 and Serie C2.

In his first season, he played at S.S. Sambenedettese where he was trained for the third time by Ballardini, and the club reached third place in rank.

In the 2007–08 season, Favaro left for Giulianova and in mid-season swapped club with Fabio Mazzeo of Valenzana.

In 2008–09 season, Favaro played for Chieti of Serie D, the 5th level and top of regional league and non-professional football.

In 2009–10 season, Favaro joined newly re-found Treviso of Eccellenza Veneto whose predecessor entered bankruptcy and finished bottom of Serie B. Favaro scored 18 goals during that season, even though he played midfielder.

The following season  Favaro played at Feltre, where he scored 11 goals.  Favaro  then played at Dolo, where  he scored 18 goals.

Education

Favaro graduated with a Bachelor of Art in Business Administration at University of Padua on October, 2013.

On December, 2015, he again graduated with a Master of Science in Sports Administration from St. Thomas University in Miami, FL.

In May, 2018, Favaro also obtained an MBA in Sport Management at St. Thomas University in Miami, FL.

References

External links
Profile at FIGC 

Italian footballers
Italy youth international footballers
A.C. Milan players
Parma Calcio 1913 players
A.S. Sambenedettese players
A.C. Prato players
Giulianova Calcio players
S.S. Chieti Calcio players
Treviso F.B.C. 1993 players
Association football forwards
Sportspeople from the Metropolitan City of Venice
1984 births
Living people
People from Mirano
Footballers from Veneto